The 1958 USC Trojans football team represented the University of Southern California (USC) in the 1958 NCAA University Division football season. In their second year under head coach Don Clark, the Trojans compiled a 4–5–1 record (4–2–1 against conference opponents), finished in third place in the Pacific Coast Conference, and outscored their opponents by a combined total of 151 to 120.

Tom Maudlin led the team in passing with 41 of 95 passes completed for 535 yards, four touchdowns and 15 interceptions. Don Buford led the team in rushing with 64 carries for 306 yards. Hillard Hill was the leading receiver with 11 catches for 319 yards and five touchdowns.

Four Trojans were recognized by either the Associated Press (AP) or the conference coaches on the 1958 All-Pacific Coast Conference football team: end Marlin McKeever (AP-1; Coaches-1); tackle Dan Ficca (AP-1; Coaches-2); guard Frank Florentino (Coaches-1 [tie]); and halfback Don Buford (Coaches-2).

Schedule

References

External links
 Game program: USC vs. Washington State at Spokane – October 25, 1958

USC
USC Trojans football seasons
USC Trojans football